The following lists events that happened during 1877 in Australia.

Incumbents

Governors
Governors of the Australian colonies:
Governor of New South Wales – Hercules Robinson, 1st Baron Rosmead
Governor of Queensland – Sir William Cairns until 14 March, then Arthur Kennedy
Governor of South Australia – Sir Anthony Musgrave until 29 January, then William Jervois
Governor of Tasmania – Frederick Weld
Governor of Victoria – Sir George Bowen
Governor of Western Australia – Sir William Robinson GCMG, then Major General The Hon. Sir Harry Ord GCMG CB RE

Premiers
Premiers of the Australian colonies:
Premier of New South Wales – 
 until 21 March: John Robertson
 21 March-16 August: Henry Parkes
 17 August-17 December: John Robertson
 starting 17 December: James Farnell
Premier of Queensland – George Thorn until 8 March, then John Douglas
Premier of South Australia – John Colton until 26 October, then James Boucaut
Premier of Tasmania – Thomas Reibey until 9 August, then Philip Fysh
Premier of Victoria – James McCulloch

Events
8 March – John Douglas becomes Premier of Queensland
10 March – Cloncurry was established
15 March to 4 April – 1877 Australia v England series is played
1 April – A settlement on Thursday Island was established for the refueling of steam ships
8 June – Lutherans found the Hermannsburg Mission at Finke River in the Northern Territory
20 July – Arthur Kennedy becomes Governor of Queensland
9 August – Philip Fysh becomes Premier of Tasmania
17 August – John Robertson begins another term as Premier of New South Wales
11 September – Ships Avalanche and Forrest collide off Portland, Victoria, only 3 of the 107 passengers are saved
2 October – William Jervois becomes Governor of South Australia
26 October – James Boucaut becomes Premier of South Australia
12 November – Harry Ord becomes Governor of Western Australia

Arts and literature

Sport 
 30 April – South Australian Football League founded.
 17 May – Victorian Football Association founded.

Births
17 January – May Gibbs
25 August – John Latham
8 October – Hans Heysen
14 November – Norman Brookes

Deaths
 25 March – Caroline Chisholm, humanitarian (b. 1808)
 2 April – Bully Hayes, ship's captain and trader
 7 April – John Arthur, Tasmanian cricketer (b. 1847)
 16 June – John Fairfax, journalist and politician (b. 1804)
 18 July – Joseph Anderson, Norfolk Island administrator (b. 1790)
 17 August – Martin Cash, convict escapee (born 1808)
 16 September – Saxe Bannister, first Attorney General of New South Wales (b. 1790)

References

 
Australia
Years of the 19th century in Australia